A&P Group Ltd is the largest ship repair and conversion company in the UK, with three shipyards located in Hebburn, Middlesbrough and Falmouth. The company undertakes a wide variety of maintenance and repair work on commercial and military ships with projects ranging from a two-day alongside repair period through to multimillion UK pound conversion projects lasting for a year or more.

History

The company was established in 1971 as A&P-Appledore International Ltd (APA), a joint venture technology transfer consultancy between British shipbuilding companies Austin & Pickersgill and Appledore Shipbuilders, and focused on ship design and construction. Initially the business was directed towards the growing Far East market, as well as the Americas and Europe. Based on the production engineering solutions developed for the innovative 'ship factory' at Appledore in the late 1960s, and subsequently at Pallion, Sunderland, APA developed the formal Build Strategy approach.  This was taken up by Hyundai when they developed the first modern shipyard in South Korea at Ulsan in the 1970s.  The Build Strategy template was subsequently adopted in British Shipbuilders' other shipyards, and in the USA.

Following sale of Appledore Shipbuilders to the Government at the time of the collapse of its parent Court Line in 1974, and the subsequent nationalisation of Austin & Pickersgill in 1977, the shareholding of APA was purchased by its management. APA acquired the shiprepair facilities of Falmouth Docks & Engineering Company in 1984 and they remain one of the company's two major centres. The Company subsequently focused on shiprepairs rather than shipbuilding, becoming A&P Group in 1995 and being acquired by Royal Bank Development Capital in 1997.

Over the years the company has operated shiprepair facilities in many parts of the world. From the mid-1970s until privatisation in 1994, the Neorion shiprepair yard on Syros was managed for the Greek Government. Dubai Drydocks opened in 1983 under APA management. 
The takeover of the former naval dockyard at Gibraltar as "Gibrepair" in 1985 was short-lived, a victim of local social politics.

In 2001 the A&P acquired Cammell Laird's shipyards at Birkenhead, Teesside and Tyneside. In 2005 A&P sold the Birkenhead yard to Northwestern Shiprepairers & Shipbuilders and closed its facilities in Southampton (King George V Dock) and the four-dock complex in Wallsend, near  Newcastle upon Tyne, in order to focus all ship repair activity in its newer facilities in Hebburn (A&P Tyne). A&P Tees at Middlesbrough was retained to support the important Southern North Sea offshore oil and gas operations and dredging contractors; the strategically situated Falmouth operation (A&P Falmouth) was also retained.

In 2009 A&P was fully acquired by Cardiff property developer Bailey Group; that company had previously acquired a 50% stake in 2006.  In 2011 A&P Group was acquired by Atlantic & Peninsula Marine Services, which also has an interest in Cammell Laird.

Current operations
As one of only two remaining significant commercial ship repair companies in the United Kingdom, along with Cammell Laird, A&P Group has become a centre of excellence for ship owners and managers operating in North West Europe and continues to grow a profitable and successful business employing over 1,000 skilled staff (678 employees in 2013 plus agency workers) in the North East and South West of England.

A&P Tyne

A&P Tyne is located at Hebburn, Tyne and Wear, UK and is positioned along the River Tyne. The facility consists of two dry docks (only one is currently in use), two quays and a large steel fabrication shed. The facility also has eight cranes lifting up to 100 tonnes, a steel workshop, joinery workshop and engineering workshop.

The dry dock at A&P Tyne is the largest on the east coast of the UK. The two quays are Bede Quay and West Quay.

A&P Tees
A&P Tees is located in Middlesbrough, UK and is located on the mouth of the River Tees. The yard has two dry docks and six cranes ranging up to forty tonnes lifting capacity. Like A&P Tyne, A&P Tees has a wide variety of workshops and fabrication sheds around the site.

A&P Falmouth
A&P Falmouth is located in Falmouth, Cornwall, UK on the mouth of the River Fal. The yard is located in the third largest natural deep water harbour in the world, and is the largest ship repair complex in the UK. A&P Falmouth has three large graving docks and can accommodate ships up to 100,000 DWT.

There are four wharfs in the yard: County Wharf, Duchy Wharf, Queens Wharf and "South of Queens Wharf".

The yard has six cranes, with a total load capacity of 60 tonnes. It has also a steel fabrication shed, engineering workshop, electrical workshop and joinery workshop.

See also
 List of shipbuilders and shipyards

References

External links
 A&P Group Official Website
 A&P Group Official Blog

Technology companies established in 1971
Engineering companies of England
Companies based in Tyne and Wear
Falmouth, Cornwall
1971 establishments in England